Shimokawa may refer to:

Places
Shimokawa, Hokkaido, a town in Kamikawa Subprefecture, Hokkaido Prefecture, Japan

People with the surname
Gary Shimokawa, American television director
Mikuni Shimokawa, Japanese musician 
Ōten Shimokawa (1892–1973), Japanese anime artist
Kenichi Shimokawa
Seigo Shimokawa
, Japanese fencer
, Japanese footballer

Japanese-language surnames